Heitor is the first compact disc studio solo album by the Brazilian musician Heitor Pereira, released in 1994 (see 1994 in music).

Track listing

Credits 
 Heitor T.P. - Bass, Cavaquinho, Drum programming, Engineer, Guitar, Matches, MIDI Guitar, Percussion, Synthesizer Bass, Arranger, Producer, Mixing
 Paulinho Braga - Percussion
 Paulinho da Costa - Percussion
 Dee Fredrix - Vocals
 Mick Hucknall - Vocals
 Claudio Infante - Drums
 Ian Kirkham - Alto saxophone
 Daren Klein - Mixing
 Kevin Lamb - Synthesizer
 The London Session Orchestra - Strings
 Arthur Maia - Bass, Fretless bass
 Guy Pratt - Bass
 Simon Climie - Vocal Arrangement
 Edward Shearmur - String Arrangements
 Marcos Suzano - Pandeiro, Percussion
 Gota Yashiki - Cymbals, Drum programming, Drums, Percussion
 Stewart Levine - Executive Producer
 Julie Gardner - Assistant Engineer
 Henry Binns - Assistant Engineer
 Nigel Godrich - Engineer
 Bernie Grundman - Mastering
 Cindy Palmano - Art Direction, Photography
 Alan Reinl - Design

External links
Blog

1994 albums
Heitor Pereira albums